Kurt van de Rijck (born 28 November 1972 in Mechelen) is an former professional Belgian darts player who has played in the Professional Darts Corporation (PDC) events.

Career

Van de Rijck reached the semi-finals of a PDC Pro Tour event in Nuland in September 2011. This result helped him to qualify for the 2012 PDC World Darts Championship via the European Order of Merit. He lost 3–0 to Wes Newton in the first round, but averaged an impressive 93.84

Van de Rijck entered the 2012 PDC Q School, and earned a PDC Pro Tour card with a 6–5 win over Andrew Gilding on the second day. He represented Belgium with Kim Huybrechts in the 2012 PDC World Cup of Darts and reached the quarter-finals, where they were defeated by Australia 3–1, having beaten Sweden in the second round. In August, van de Rijck beat Roland Scholten in the European Qualifier for the German Darts Masters, but then lost 6–4 to James Wade in the first round in Stuttgart.

Van de Rijck began 2013 ranked world number 98. He qualified for the first European Tour event of the year, the UK Masters and beat Steve Beaton 6–4 in the first round, before losing 6–1 to Michael van Gerwen. This result helped him to qualify for the European Championship for the first time through the European Order of Merit. He played van Gerwen and lost 6–1 again.

World Championship Results

PDC
2012: First round: (lost to Wes Newton 0–3)

References

External links

Living people
Belgian darts players
Sportspeople from Mechelen
Professional Darts Corporation former tour card holders
1972 births
British Darts Organisation players
PDC World Cup of Darts Belgian team